Muskogee Police Department is the primary law enforcement agency in Muskogee, Oklahoma. Consisting of 91 sworn officers and 28 other employees, the department serves a population of over 40,000 people.

History
The Muskogee Police Department was established in 1898. Prior to its establishment, law enforcement in Muskogee was provided by the United States Marshals Service and a city marshal. One early officer was Federal Deputy Marshal Bass Reeves, the first African American to serve in such an office.

Since 1995, crime rate has reduced 45% in Muskogee. According to records by the Oklahoma State Bureau of Investigation, in 2002, 2008 and 2009, no murders were committed for the entire year.

Muskogee Police made the news after pursuing an alleged traffic stop from a man running a stop sign and continuing to his mother's home after refusing to stop led to police forcing their way into the home where the situation ended with administering pepper spray on the 84-year-old mother as well as the tasering of the 54-year-old man police were pursuing.  The matter is under investigation after pressure arose online following the release of body camera video.  Many believe the police utilized unnecessary force, especially in spraying the woman, who many believed did not seem threatening or uncooperative.  The incident happened Aug 7, 2016.

In 2009, two local officers arrested Larry Eugene Chaplin. They handcuffed him and then allowed a police dog to attack him while he was on the ground. In March 2012, the city settled with Chaplin for an undisclosed amount.

The department was under the supervision and operational command of Chief of Police Rex Eskridge, a member of the department since 1969 and police chief since 1992.
Chief of Police Rex Eskridge retired in July 2018 after 49 years of service. Deputy Chief Johnny Teehee was sworn in as Chief of Police on July 17, 2018.

See also

List of law enforcement agencies in Oklahoma

References

External links
 Muskogee Police Department website

Muskogee, Oklahoma
Muskogee
1898 establishments in Indian Territory